Danielle Nantkes Conrad is a politician from the U.S. state of Nebraska.  From 2007 to 2015, she served in the Nebraska State Legislature, representing District 46 on the city of Lincoln's north side. She was elected again to the Nebraska Legislature in 2022.

Early life and education 
She was born on August 5, 1977, in Seward, Nebraska. Her father served as a Deputy Sheriff for over 25 years. Her mother has been a teacher at Lincoln Public Schools for over 15 years. Nantkes graduated from the University of Nebraska-Lincoln with a B.A. in 2000. She went on to earn her Juris Doctor at the University of Nebraska–Lincoln College of Law in 2003.

Career 
After becoming a member of the Nebraska State Bar Association, she took a job with the Nebraska Appleseed Center for Law in the Public Interest, a non-profit, non-partisan law project providing legal counsel to the poor, minorities, and immigrants in the state of Nebraska.

Nebraska Legislature (2007–2015) 
A registered Democrat, she first ran for elected office in 2006, seeking to represent the 46th Legislative District. With 55% of the vote she defeated Republican Carol Brown for the non-partisan seat. Her standing committee assignments included Appropriations and Nebraska Retirement Systems. She also served on the Performance Audit Committee, Redistricting Committee, and chaired the Legislature's Innovation and Entrepreneurial Task Force.

During Conrad's time in office, she was one of only ten women in the 49-member Nebraska Legislature. According to a background article prepared by Unicameral Update, Conrad became a fan of politics as a teenager, following the historic race for Governor pitting two women, Republican Kay Orr against Democrat Helen Boosalis.

Due to term limits, she did not seek re-election to the Legislature in 2014, and was succeeded by Adam Morfeld.

Executive Director of the ACLU of Nebraska 
Conrad headed the ACLU of Nebraska since 2014, during her time the number of staff grew from just four people to a team of ten full-time staff with two contact lawyers. Legal victories were won within LGBTQ equality, open government, and reproductive rights. She also supported expanding Medicaid eligibility, banning predatory payday lending, eliminating the last vestiges of slavery from Nebraska's state constitution, increasing the minimum wage, and increasing election election participation through a mass mailing of vote-by-mail applications.

Personal life 
Conrad's affiliations in the community include the Lincoln YWCA Board of Directors; Community Development Taskforce, Nebraska Bar Association, Lincoln Bar Association, and the Volunteer Lawyers Project.

She was married in 2008 and is now Danielle Conrad.

Electoral history

References 

Democratic Party Nebraska state senators
1977 births
Living people
Women state legislators in Nebraska
People from Seward, Nebraska
University of Nebraska–Lincoln alumni
21st-century American women